At least three ships of the Royal Navy have borne the name HMS Sarpedon. They are named after Sarpedon, a Greek hero and son of Zeus.

  was an 18-gun  brig-sloop launched in 1809 and foundered in 1813.
 HMS Sarpedon (1913) was a  destroyer that was renamed HMS Laertes within three months of launching in 1913.
  was a  destroyer launched in 1916 and sold in 1926.

See also
 Sarpedon (disambiguation)

References

Royal Navy ship names